Ogre is a fictional character appearing in American comic books published by Marvel Comics.

Fictional character biography
Ogre was originally an operative of the mutant terrorist organization Factor Three. He had no mutant powers, but used technological gadgets to give him super-abilities, and he used an explosive helmet to force Banshee into battling the original X-Men. When Banshee was defeated, Ogre went in to kill his captive pawn and capture Charles Xavier, but was thwarted and defeated by the Mimic.

When Factor Three disbanded, Ogre remained behind in Mount Charteris (outside Burton Canyon, Colorado), one of their many mountain bases. Over the years the base was occupied by HYDRA, the Sons of the Serpent, August Masters and the Masters of Evil (led by the second Crimson Cowl). When Moonstone was held prisoner by the Masters of Evil, Ogre slipped a key into her room which released her from her shackles. This helped Moonstone and the Thunderbolts defeat the Masters.

Hawkeye, the new leader of the Thunderbolts, suggested that they keep Mount Charteris as their own headquarters. As time passed, the Thunderbolts began to notice strange things happening in their headquarters. Atlas's damaged costume was repaired. A hover vehicle Hawkeye borrowed from the Champions was renovated overnight. The team began to realize someone was hiding in the unexplored levels of Mount Charteris and began to investigate.

After a brief skirmish with the Thunderbolts, Atlas convinced Ogre that they meant him no harm. The Ogre recounted his story and Hawkeye offered Ogre membership. Soon after, the Thunderbolts went back to their part of the mountain base and Ogre was knocked unconscious by Techno, a former member of the Thunderbolts. Techno had Ogre placed in a cryogenic sleep. Techno then morphed his appearance so he would resemble Ogre and took his place on the team.

For months Techno pretended to be Ogre, causing mischief amongst his former teammates. When Techno was seemingly destroyed by Scourge saving Jolt (who had also been in cryogenic sleep), Ogre was released.

Soon after, it was revealed that Ogre had his own cryogenic prisoner that he had been holding captive for several years. Sonny Baredo, a.k.a. Humus Sapien, was kidnapped by Factor Three years earlier, but it was decided he was too dangerous to be released. When the Thunderbolts disbanded the Redeemers and S.H.I.E.L.D. took over operation of Mount Charteris, a resurrected Techno (now in a human body) began to investigate and released Baredo. Mount Charteris was destroyed as a result. The Redeemers fought Humus Sapien and discovered that every time he used his powers, someone else on Earth died. Eventually Baredo decided to leave Earth through an extra-dimensional tesseract rather than endanger innocents. Ogre chose to leave Earth with him, in part to gain redemption for his keeping Baredo prisoner.

Powers and abilities
Ogre appears to have an increased level of engineering and scientific knowledge beyond the current level of technology, including the design and creation of weapons systems and vehicles. He carries various weapons of his own design, such as particle blasters and lasers.

References

External links

Characters created by Roy Thomas
Comics characters introduced in 1967
Fictional inventors
Marvel Comics superheroes
Marvel Comics supervillains